The men's freestyle heavyweight was a freestyle wrestling event held as part of the Wrestling at the 1928 Summer Olympics programme. It was the fifth appearance of the event. Heavyweight was the heaviest category, including wrestlers weighing over 87 kilograms.

Results
Source: Official results; Wudarski

Gold medal round

Silver medal round

Bronze medal round

References

Wrestling at the 1928 Summer Olympics